Governing Council of the Hetman Office was a provisional form of the Collegium of Little Russia in the Hetmanate and Sloboda Ukraine that was established by Anna of Russia in 1734. It was subordinated to the Governing Senate in Saint-Petersburg.

After the death of Hetman Danylo Apostol in 1734, the Russian government did not allow to conduct elections of the Hetman of Zaporizhian Host. Instead, the post was replaced by an appointed council that consisted of three Russian officials and three officials of Cossack seniors (starshyna).

Members of the council

Presidents
 1734 - 1736 Prince Aleksei Shakhovskoy
 1736 - 1738 Prince Ivan Baryatinskiy
 1738 - 1738 Ivan Shipov (acting)
 1738 - 1740 Alexander Rumyantsev
 1740 - 1740 Ivan Shipov (acting)
 1740 - 1741 Yakov Keyt
 1741 - 1741 Ivan Neplyuyev
 1741 - 1742 Alexander Buturlin
 1742 - 1745 Ivan Bibikov
 1745 - 1750 Mikhail Leontiev

Russian members
 Prince Aleksei Shakhovskoy (:ru:Шаховской, Алексей Иванович)
 Prince Ivan Baryatinskiy (:ru:Барятинский, Иван Фёдорович), a grandson of Yury Baryatinsky
 Colonel Guriev
 Mikhail Leontiev (:ru:Леонтьев, Михаил Иванович)
 Ivan Bibikov (:ru:Бибиков, Иван Иванович (сановник))
 Ivan Shipov
 Alexander Rumyantsev
 Yakov Keyt
 Ivan Neplyuyev
 Alexander Buturlin

Ukrainian members
 Quartermaster General Yakiv Lyzohub
 Treasurer General Andriy Markevych (:uk:Маркевич Андрій Маркович)
 Aide-de-camp General Fedir Lysenko (:uk:Лисенко Федір Іванович)
 Judge General Mykhailo Zabila (:uk:Забіла Михайло Тарасович)

See also
 Little Russian Office
 Hetman of Zaporizhian Host
 General Officer Staff (Hetmanate)

External links
 Governing Council of the Hetman Office at the Encyclopedia of Ukraine
 Governing Council of the Hetman Office at the Ukrainian Soviet Encyclopedia
 Governing Council of the Hetman Office at the Legal Encyclopedia
 Governing Council of the Hetman Office  at the Handbook on history of Ukraine

Government of the Cossack Hetmanate
18th century in the Zaporozhian Host